Everyone's a Dreamer is the debut studio album by Canadian country music artist Clayton Bellamy. It was released on March 6, 2012 by MDM Recordings. The album received three stars out of five from Bruce Leperre of the Winnipeg Free Press.

Track listing

References

2012 debut albums
Clayton Bellamy albums
MDM Recordings albums